Schistura pakistanica is a species of ray-finned fish in the genus Schistura, although some authorities have placed this stone loach in the genus Paraschistura.

References

Fish described in 1969
Taxa named by Petre Mihai Bănărescu
pakistanica